Rajeev Dhavan (born 4 August 1946) is an Indian Senior Advocate, a human rights activist, and a Commissioner of the International Commission of Jurists. He is the author or co-author of numerous books on legal and human rights topics, and is a regular columnist in the leading newspapers in India. He is the son of the late diplomat and jurist Shanti Swaroop Dhavan.

Dhavan led the attorney team for the Muslims in the famous Babri Masjid case.

Career
Rajeev Dhavan did his schooling from Boys' High School and College and Sherwood College, Nainital. He studied law at Allahabad University, then at Emmanuel College, Cambridge (where he was elected President of the Cambridge Union) and London University. He has taught at Queen's University Belfast, Brunel University, the University of Wisconsin–Madison and the University of Texas at Austin. He is an Honorary Professor at the Indian Law Institute.

Dhavan is a senior advocate of the Supreme Court of India and was designated in 1994. He runs the Public Interest Legal Support and Research Centre, which tries to make youth aware of constitutional and legal subjects. Dhavan was elected to the International Commission of Jurists in 1998 and was a member of the Executive Committee between 2003 and 2007, and from 2009. He was appointed the chairperson of the Executive Committee in 2009.

In March 2003 Dhavan was a signatory to a statement that condemned the US-led invasion of Iraq, calling it "unprovoked, unjustified and violative of international law and the United Nations Charter". Other signatories included Rajinder Sachar, Shanti Bhushan, Pavani Parameswara Rao, Kapil Sibal and Prashant Bhushan.

Dhavan has represented the Babri Masjid Action Committee before the Allahabad High Court over the title to the land on which the mosque stood before being destroyed by a mob in 1992. When the Allahabad High Court ruled that the site should be divided between Hindus and Muslims, Dhavan said: "This is Panchayati justice which takes away the legal rights of Muslims and converts the moral sentimental entitlements of Hindus into legal rights". Dhavan also alleged the judges during the hearing of having an aggressive tone, however he later apologized stating he got emotionally carried away during the hearing.

Bibliography

 Source: https://www.jstor.org/stable/43950943

References

Living people
1946 births
Alumni of the University of London
Indian human rights activists
Alumni of Emmanuel College, Cambridge
Presidents of the Cambridge Union
People from Allahabad